Giacomo Babini (22 February 1929 – 1 November 2021) was an Italian Roman Catholic prelate. He was bishop of Pitigliano-Sovana-Orbetello from 1991 to 1996 and Grosseto from 1996 to 2001.

References 

1929 births
2021 deaths
Bishops in Tuscany
20th-century Italian Roman Catholic bishops
21st-century Italian Roman Catholic bishops
People from Grosseto